Henri Delcellier (3 June 1902 – 16 May 1975) was a Canadian fencer. He competed in the team épée event at the 1932 Summer Olympics.

References

External links
 

1902 births
1975 deaths
Sportspeople from Béziers
French emigrants to Quebec
Canadian male fencers
Olympic fencers of Canada
Fencers at the 1932 Summer Olympics